The Fortezza Medicea is an occasional restaurant in Volterra, Italy. It is housed in the town's Renaissance-era fortress (Fortezza Medicea), built 1474, which is a high-security prison for criminals serving no less than seven years.

In 2006, the prison's administration began operating a restaurant within the prison, using inmates as staff, as a rehabilitation scheme. The project was successful in attracting clients and the attention of the international press. Despite the inconveniences of dining in the Fortezza – clients must pass a background check and several checkpoints, and all cutlery is plastic – tables, as of 2007, had to be booked weeks in advance.

References

External links 
  
 

Restaurants in Italy